Simon Marcus Catterall (born 1964) is an American physicist at Syracuse University. His research involves High Energy Theory, particularly Lattice field theory.

He was elected Fellow of the American Physical Society in 2016 for ''"For numerous important contributions to computational physics and Lattice field theory through studies of gravity, technicolor, and especially the lattice formulation of supersymmetric field theories".

References

1964 births
Living people
21st-century American physicists
Syracuse University faculty
Fellows of the American Physical Society